The Dead River is a short tributary of the Willamette River east of Corvallis in the U.S. state of Oregon. It begins at the lower end of Colorado Lake in Linn County and flows generally east along the south side of Truax Island, which separates the Dead River from the main stem Willamette. The Dead River then turns north and enters the larger river after crossing into Benton County at Half Moon Bend northeast of Orleans.

The only named tributary of the Dead River is Owl Creek, which feeds Colorado Lake.

See also
 List of rivers of Oregon

References

Rivers of Linn County, Oregon
Rivers of Oregon